The 40th Golden Raspberry Awards, or Razzies, was an awards ceremony that honored the worst the film industry had to offer in 2019. The awards are based on votes from members of the Golden Raspberry Foundation. The nominees were announced on February 8, 2020, one day prior to the 92nd Academy Awards. The ceremony, the date of which was later announced to be March 14, 2020, was ultimately cancelled amid the concerns over the COVID-19 pandemic. The organizers announced the ceremony's winners online on March 16, 2020. No nominees were announced for the "Worst of the Decade Awards", despite being the tradition for the final ceremony of the decade.

Winners and nominees
The nominations were announced on February 8, 2020.

Films with multiple wins and nominations
The following ten films received multiple nominations:

The following films received multiple wins:

Criticism 
The ballot itself was heavily criticized for overlooking critically panned films while nominating limitedly distributed pictures. For instance, The Fanatic was nominated in the main categories despite the award's official website posting that the film was eligible for the Barry L. Bumstead special award, who is given to limited distributed films. 

There was also criticism for the pre-nomination of James McAvoy's well-received performance in the otherwise poorly received film Glass. His performance ended up not being nominated. Bruce Willis's performance was criticized for being nominated in the Worst Supporting Actor category despite it having been a main role. 

The critically panned Dark Phoenix, despite two nominations for Worst Supporting Actress and Worst Remake, Rip-off or Sequel, was criticized for overlooking the film in other categories, such as Worst Picture, Worst Screenplay, and Worst Director for Simon Kinberg in his directorial debut.  

The Worst Reckless Disregard for Human Life and Public Property nominations were also heavily criticized. WhatCulture criticized the nominations, saying that "It feels as though voters just wanted to nominate Joker for the enormous social media publicity it would generate, and then shaped a dubious awards category around it. Dragged Across Concrete is an even weirder pick, though, both because of its low-budget nature and the fact that there's not that much carnage in it. Michael Bay's 6 Underground is clearly a far worthier nominee than either of those films, given how much obvious human collateral damage is racked up amid the chaotic action sequences."

Planned ceremony
In June 2019, Comedy Dynamics (a company founded by Brian Volk-Weiss) announced that it would produce the awards ceremony. Also, it was to be broadcast live on a "Comedy Dynamics Network", which would have marked the first time a Golden Raspberry ceremony was watched by public through a live telecast.

The unusual scheduling of the 92nd Academy Awards (usually held towards the end of February) on February 9 affected the 2020 edition of the Golden Raspberry Awards. The organizers announced the nominees on February 8, 2020, one day prior to the AMPAS event. The organizers later announced that the year's Razzie ceremony would be held on March 14; it would have been the second ceremony held after the Academy Awards, spurning the tradition of announcing the winners on the eve of the Oscars ceremony.

Despite the COVID-19 pandemic, the ceremony was going to go on as scheduled. The organizers later ultimately announced that the ceremony was cancelled, citing bans on mass gatherings that were enacted by local authorities in the wake of the outbreak. The organizers eventually announced winners online on March 16, 2020, through their website and their YouTube channel.

See also
 92nd Academy Awards
 77th Golden Globe Awards
 73rd British Academy Film Awards
 35th Independent Spirit Awards
 26th Screen Actors Guild Awards
 25th Critics' Choice Awards

Notes

References

External links
 

Golden Raspberry
Golden Raspberry
Golden Raspberry Awards
Golden Raspberry Awards ceremonies
Golden Raspberry Awards